Operación rosa rosa (English: Operation Pink Rose) is a 1974 Argentine film, directed by Polish-born director Leo Fleider. The film was written by, and starred, the singer Sandro de América.

Cast
 Sandro

References

External links
 

1974 films
Argentine drama films
1970s Spanish-language films
1970s Argentine films
Films directed by Leo Fleider